Fairlop is an area of Ilford, in the London Borough of Redbridge in east London. 

As well as residential areas, the district includes farmland, woodland and recreational facilities such as Fairlop Waters and Redbridge Sports Centre. The area, which has its own tube station, is located 11 miles north-east of Charing Cross. 

The area takes its name from the Fairlop Oak, a large tree, which once stood in the area, which was then part of Hainault Forest.

History and origins of the name

The Fairlop Oak
The district took its name from an old oak tree, the Fairlop Oak, that stood in Hainault Forest, most of which was destroyed in the mid-nineteenth century. The oak is said to have had a trunk sixty-six feet in circumference, from which seventeen branches issued, most of them measuring not less than twelve feet in girth. 

In the eighteenth century, a pump and block maker from Wapping, Daniel Day, would take his employees to the annual fair in the forest, using the oak as their rendezvous. The fair took place on the first Friday of July.  They dined on beans and bacon, and this may be the origin of the English words bean-feast and beano.

The Fairlop Fair
By the middle of the eighteenth century, the annual excursion to Fairlop had become one of London's most popular entertainments, and as many as a hundred thousand people being drawn through Ilford to the fair in the forest. As a result, the area became known as "Fair" (after the fair) followed by "lop" referring to the tree flourishing after part of it was used to make Daniel Day's coffin after he died in 1767. A Society of Archers - The Hainault Foresters - under the patronage of the Earl Tylney of Wanstead House met under the Fairlop Oak.

A legend has it that Queen Anne visited Fairlop during the fair. One of the songs sung at the fair was called "Come, come, my boys", in which one verse states:

In June 1805, the oak tree caught fire, and by 1820 it was finally blown down. Its site is marked roughly at the boat house by the lake at Fairlop Waters. In nearby Fullwell Cross is a pub called the New Fairlop Oak.

In 1851, there was an Act of Parliament permitting the enclosure of Hainault Forest, the large majority of which was quickly destroyed and turned into farmland.

Location
The western part of the district adjoins Barkingside High Street shopping district, and also borders Claybury Park, which used to be home to Claybury Hospital. Neighbouring areas include Barkingside, Aldborough Hatch, Hainault and more distantly, Marks Gate and Collier Row. It is 3 miles from Ilford town centre.

Demography
According to the 2011 census in Fairlop ward, the population was 65% white (57% British, 7% Other, 1% Irish). 9% is Indian and 6% Other Asian.

Transport
In 1903 a railway station at Fairlop was opened on a new loop line that formed part of the Great Eastern Railway. In 1948 the line was taken over by the London Underground as part of the eastward extension of the Central line and the station became Fairlop Underground station.

Forest Road, the area's main road, did not have a bus service until route 462 was extended from Hainault to Fairlop in June 2016.

See also
 Barkingside
 Fairlop tube station
 Fairlop's history

References

Districts of the London Borough of Redbridge